2004 Belarusian First League was the fourteenth season of 2nd level football championship in Belarus. It started in April and ended in November 2004.

Team changes from 2003 season
Two top teams of last season (Lokomotiv Vitebsk and MTZ-RIPO Minsk) were promoted to Belarusian Premier League. They were replaced by two teams that finished at the bottom of 2003 Belarusian Premier League table (Lokomotiv Minsk and Molodechno-2000).

Two teams that finished at the bottom of 2003 season table (Neman Mosty and Pinsk-900) relegated to the Second League. They were replaced by two best teams of 2003 Second League (Baranovichi and Veras Nesvizh).

Teams and locations

League table

Top goalscorers

See also
2004 Belarusian Premier League
2003–04 Belarusian Cup
2004–05 Belarusian Cup

External links
RSSSF

Belarusian First League seasons
2
Belarus
Belarus